is a Japanese football player. He plays for Arterivo Wakayama.

He previously played for Shonan Bellmare.

Club statistics

References

External links

1988 births
Living people
People from Zama, Kanagawa
Association football people from Kanagawa Prefecture
Japanese footballers
J1 League players
J2 League players
Japan Football League players
Shonan Bellmare players
Gainare Tottori players
Zweigen Kanazawa players
FC Osaka players
Nara Club players
Association football midfielders